Dr. Pannadasa Gardiye Punchihewa, C.C.S (b. Mirissa, Sri Lanka, 1 November 1935) is a Sri Lankan author and an international civil servant.

Early life
Pannadasa Gardiye Punchihewa was born in 1935 in the southern village of Mirissa in Sri Lanka.

Education

After being selected at the fifth standard scholarship examination he got admitted to the Central College, Telijjawila and passed his Senior School Certificate Examination in first division. He then joined Ananda College, Colombo and gained admission to the University of Ceylon in 1955. He passed out with a bachelor's degree with a second class (upper division), taught for a short while at Ananda College and the University. In 1960 he joined the Ceylon Civil Service.
He also has a Diploma on Rural Social Development from the University of Reading UK and has obtained his Doctorate in Philosophy from the University of Sri Jayawardena pura, Sri Lanka.

Civil Service
Ceylon Civil Service

He commenced his public service as a cadet at the Galle Kachcheri and his first appointment was as an Assistant Controller of General Treasury. His subsequent appointments were as Government Agent of Moneragala District, Puttlam District, Kalutara District, Additional Secretary of Ministry of Plantation Industries, and Secretary  of Ministry of Coconut Industries. He also held the posts of Chairman Coconut Cultivation Board and Chairman Coconut Development Authority.

International Civil Service
In 1985 he was elected to the post of Executive Director, Asian and Pacific Coconut Community (A.P.C.C), an Intergovernmental Organization based in Jakarta. He was re-elected three times and continued in that position until 2000.

After retiring from APCC and returning to Sri Lanka he served as a consultant to the UNDP (Colombo) and Government of Sri Lanka.

Publications
He has more than thirty publications to his credit published in English and Sinhalese which include research works, fiction, memoirs, translations and children’s books. Among the children’s books is his Mahi Pancha series consisting of six books about a little fly. He won the State Literary Award by the Government of Sri Lanka twice, for the best translation (2008) and the best children’s book (2002).

Children’s Books:
 (State Literary Award 2002)
 
 Mahi Pancha series: A series of children’s stories around a mischievous, inquisitive and intelligent little fly whom the author named Mahi Pancha. To date has five books in English and  five in Sinhalese with each having three or four stories. The other titles include Mahi Pancha and his friends, Mahi Pancha and the fireflies, Mahi Pancha and Ali Pancha, Mahi Pancha becomes king, Mahi Panchai Mahi Panchiyi and Mahi Rajata tagi boga.
Illustrations are by Sybil Wettasingha
Translations:
 
 
 
 Ganabol Polowa by PG Punchihewa into English Published by Stamford Lake Publications 2008
Fiction:

Research:

  

Memoirs:

Family
He is married to Anoma Punchihewa (née de Silva ) and they have two children.

References

External links
 Dr. B.S.Wijeweera, “Two villages in the jungle” Punchihewa’s Shattered Earth and Leonard Woolf’s celebrated village, The Island, 14 May 2008. 
 Tissa Devendra,  “The Shattered Earth a Sensitive Novel”, Sunday Island, 27 April 2008
 Carol Aloysius, “The Shattered Earth”, The Nation, 15 June 2008 
 Barry Tebb, “The Jungle in the Village”, The Sunday Times, 8 June 2008 
 Anne Abeysekera, “The Story that has the ring of truth”, The Island, 10 June 2008 
 K.S Sivakumaran, Moneragala Then (and even Now), The Daily News, 9 July 2008
 Bandu Silva, Dutugamunu, National Hero –a self-made personality,  Ceylon Today, 17th Sep 2012
 Prof K.N.O. Dharmadasa,  King Dutugamunu, Daily News, 22nd Aug 2012
 Kala Corner, A well researched work on a national hero, Sunday Times, August 26, 2012  
 R.S.Karunaratna, “Focus on a legendary national hero”, Sunday Observer, September 16, 2012
 S.B.Atugoda, Musings of  a Monarch, Daily News, 24 October 2012
 K.S.Sivakumaran, Literary Pot-pourri, Daily  News, 28 November 2007
 Daisy Abey, A collage of memorable experiences, Daily News, 6 February 2008 
 Carol Aloysius, “Nostalgic recollection”, The Nation, 4 February 2008 
 Dr Leel Gunasekera, Men and matters of a time that was, Sunday Times, 10 February 2008
 Carl Muller, Reminiscences of forty years in Civil Service, Sunday Observer, 30 November 2008
 Gamini Seneviratne, Stories/memories, Sunday Island, 16th Dec 2007
 Tissa Devendra, Sparkling stories from kachcheries and beyond” The Island, 17 November 2007 
 Prof Sunanda Mahendra, Resourceful Travel Notes, Daily News, 28 January 2001
 Manel Tampoe, A Sinhala translation of Kon Tiki after 32 years, The Island, 16 March 1982 
 Somapala Jaywardena, “Kontiki Yathrawa” Lankadeepa, September 1981 
 Neetha Ratnapala, The crafty Bali woman’s eating house, Sunday Island 13 December 2005  
 Dr Vincent Sandanayake, Popular Indonesian Novel in Sinhala, Daily News, 24 November 2004

Sinhalese writers
Sri Lankan Buddhists
Alumni of Ananda College
Alumni of the University of Peradeniya
1935 births
Living people